Boxing has been contested at every Asian Games since its introduction to the program at the 1954 Asian Games.

Editions

Medal table

List of medalists

References 
Sports123

 
Asian Games
Asian Games
Asian Games
Sports at the Asian Games